Girl Friends is a K-pop group made up of real-life friends, Yuri and Chae Rina.  They released two albums with mixed success; their debut single was "Maybe I Love You."

History
Both Yuri and Chae Rina have previously been part of major Korean pop groups: Yuri in Cool, and Chae in Roo'ra and Diva.  They became friends in the 1990s while performing with their respective groups, and discussed doing a joint project for 10 years.  When they found time to do so, they debated on various names (including "Yurina") before deciding on "Girl Friends"; afterwards, Chae stated that it felt great to keep their promise and release an album.

Their first album, Another Myself, was released on July 29, 2006.  Described as an R&B album, the duo mentioned that it was an album made with no regrets, and they put their best efforts into making a great album.  Their first single was "Maybe I Love You."  The album sold 8000 copies by the end of August, according to the Music Industry Association of Korea.

Their second album, Addict 2 Times, was released in August 2007.  The duo did not make an official comeback performance until October 2007; at the time, they stated that they wanted to win fans with their songs instead of their dances.  The album sold 1,777 copies in its month of release; it has not charted since.

Discography

Albums
Another Myself July 29, 2006
Addict 2 Times August 20, 2007

References

External links
 Official website
 A KBS Radio biography on the group (English)

South Korean girl groups
K-pop music groups
Musical groups established in 2006
2006 establishments in South Korea